The 1997 All-Big Ten Conference football team consists of American football players chosen as All-Big Ten Conference players for the 1997 Big Ten Conference football season.  The conference recognizes two official All-Big Ten selectors: (1) the Big Ten conference coaches selected separate offensive and defensive units and named first- and second-team players (the "Coaches" team); and (2) a panel of sports writers and broadcasters covering the Big Ten also selected offensive and defensive units and named first- and second-team players (the "Media" team).

Offensive selections

Quarterbacks
 Billy Dicken, Purdue (Coaches-1; Media-2)
 Brian Griese, Michigan (Coaches-2; Media-1)

Running backs
 Tavian Banks, Iowa (Coaches-1; Media-1)
 Curtis Enis, Penn State (Coaches-1; Media-1)
 Ron Dayne, Wisconsin (Coaches-2; Media-2)
 Sedrick Irvin, Michigan State (Coaches-2; Media-2)

Center
 Zach Adami, Michigan (Coaches-1; Media-1)
 Derek Rose, Iowa (Coaches-2; Media-2)

Guards
 Phil Ostrowski, Penn State (Coaches-1; Media-1)
 Steve Hutchinson, Michigan (Coaches-2; Media-1)
 Mike Golf, Iowa (Coaches-1)
 Rob Murphy, Ohio State (Coaches-2; Media-2)
 Scott Shaw, Michigan State (Media-2)

Tackles
 Flozell Adams, Michigan State (Coaches-1; Media-1)
 Jon Jansen, Michigan (Coaches-1; Media-2)
 Eric Gohlstin, Ohio State (Coaches-2; Media-1)
 Jeff Backus, Michigan (Coaches-2; Media-2)

Tight ends
 Jerame Tuman, Michigan (Coaches-1; Media-1)
 Josh Keur, Michigan State (Coaches-2; Media-2)

Receivers
 Brian Alford, Purdue (Coaches-1; Media-1)
 David Boston, Ohio State (Coaches-1; Media-1)
 Tim Dwight, Iowa (Coaches-2; Media-1)
 Joe Jurevicius, Penn State (Coaches-2; Media-2)
 Tutu Atwell, Minnesota (Coaches-2; Media-2)

Defensive selections

Defensive linemen
 Casey Dailey, Northwestern (Coaches-1; Media-1)
 Jared DeVries, Iowa (Coaches-1; Media-1)
 Glen Steele, Michigan (Coaches-1; Media-1)
 Lamanzer Williams, Minnesota (Coaches-1; Media-1)
 Adewale Ogunleye, Indiana (Coaches-1; Media-2)
 Robaire Smith, Michigan State (Coaches-2; Media-2)
 Josh Williams, Michigan (Coaches-2; Media-2)
 Rosevelt Colvin, Purdue (Media-2)
 Courtney Brown, Penn State (Media-2)
 Tom Burke, Wisconsin (Media-2)

Linebackers
 Barry Gardner, Northwestern (Coaches-1; Media-1)
 Andy Katzenmoyer, Ohio State (Coaches-1; Media-1)
 Ike Reese, Michigan State (Coaches-1; Media-2)
 Sam Sword, Michigan (Coaches-2; Media-1)
 Aaron Collins, Penn State (Coaches-2; Media-2)
 Jim Nelson, Penn State (Coaches-2; Media-2)

Defensive backs
 Marcus Ray, Michigan (Coaches-1; Media-1)
 Antoine Winfield, Ohio State (Coaches-1; Media-1)
 Charles Woodson, Michigan (Coaches-1; Media-1)
 Damon Moore, Ohio State (Coaches-2; Media-1)
 Andre Weathers, Michigan (Coaches-1)
 Amp Campbell, Michigan State (Coaches-2; Media-2)
 Tyrone Carter, Minnesota (Coaches-2; Media-2)
 Eric Collier, Northwestern (Coaches-2; Media)
 Plez Atkins, Iowa (Coaches-2)
 Ray Hill, Michigan State (Media-2)

Key

See also
 1997 College Football All-America Team

References

All-Big Ten Conference
All-Big Ten Conference football teams